Southern Command is a formation of the Indian Army, active since 1895. It has seen action during the integration of several Princely States into modern India, during the 1961 Indian liberation of Goa, and during the 1965 and 1971 Indo-Pakistani Wars. Lieutenant General Ajai Kumar Singh is the current Southern Army Commander.

History

Early history
The Presidency armies were abolished with effect from 1 April 1895 when the three Presidency armies became the Indian Army. The Indian Army was divided into four Commands (Bengal Command, Bombay Command, Madras Command and Punjab Command) each under a lieutenant general.

In 1908, the four commands were merged into two Armies (Northern Army and Southern Army): this system persisted until 1920 when the arrangement reverted to four commands again (Eastern Command, Northern Command, Southern Command and Western Command). In 1914, the Southern Army consisted of the 4th (Quetta) Division, the 5th (Mhow) Division, the 6th (Poona) Division, the 9th (Secunderabad) Division, and the Aden Brigade.

Second World War
During the Second World War, Southern Command was reformed as Southern Army (equivalent to a corps) in April 1942. The formation reverted to the title Southern Command in November 1945.

Component divisions included:
19th Indian Infantry Division, April 1942 to July 1944
2nd British Infantry Division, June 1942 to April 1943, and then June 1945 to August 1945
70th British Infantry Division, July 1943 to October 1943
81st (West Africa) Division, March 1945 to August 1945
36th Infantry Division (British Army), June 1945 to August 1945

Component brigades included:
7th Armoured Brigade, June 1942 to September 1942
British 6th Infantry Brigade, November 1942 to December 1942
150th Indian Infantry Brigade March 1944 to August 1945
26th Indian Infantry Brigade July 1944 to December 1944

Post war
In August 1947, Southern Command had the Deccan, Madras and Bombay Areas (with HQs at Kamptee, Madras and Bombay). 
In 1947–48, Southern Command was largely responsible in getting Junagadh and Hyderabad to sign the instrument of accession to India. 1st Armoured Division did the actual incursion into Hyderabad. In 1961, the Indian annexation of Goa was conducted by 17th Infantry Division and 50th Parachute Brigade, under the operational control of Southern Command.

In 1965–66, two further divisions were raised within the command. After fighting broke out in the Rann of Kutch in April 1965, a hastily constituted force, named Kilo Force under Maj. Gen P. O. Dunn was formed to contain this attack. Kilo Force was later re-designated as 11 Infantry Division. In September 1965, the operational responsibility for the Barmer sector was given to Southern Command and entrusted to 11 Infantry Division. Delhi and Rajasthan Area, with its Advance Headquarters at Jodhpur, fought in the Indo-Pakistani War of 1965 under Western Command. On 3 November 1966, this formation was re-designated 12th Infantry Division, under Major General J.F.R. Jacob, and also placed under Southern Command.

Structure
The command headquarters is located in Pune, Maharashtra. It consists of two corps and two military areas. The two areas are:- Maharashtra Goa and Gujarat Area (MG&G Area) and the Andhra, Tamil Nadu, Karnataka and Kerala Area (ATNK&K Area) In 2005, the changes to its jurisdiction area were made when a new South Western Command was established.

Precursors (1907-1948) 
Following is the List of precursors to the Southern Command and their commanders:

Southern Command (1907-1908)

Southern Army (1908-1920)

Southern Command (1920-1942)

Southern Army (1942-1945)

List of GOC-in-C of Southern Command (1945- present)

Notes

Sources 

Commands of the Indian Army
Military units and formations established in 1895
Military units and formations of India in World War II
1895 establishments in India